The R319 road is a regional road in County Mayo in Ireland.

The government legislation that defines the R319, the Roads Act 1993 (Classification of Regional Roads) Order 2012 (Statutory Instrument 54 of 2012), provides the following official description:

Mallaranny — Keem, County Mayo

Between its junction with N59 at Mallaranny and its terminal point at Keem Strand via Tóin re Gaoth Thoir, Poll Raithní, Gob an Choire, An Caiseal, Bun an Churraigh, Cabin, Keel, Dooagh and Keel West all in the county of Mayo.

See also
 List of roads of County Mayo
 National primary road
 National secondary road
 Regional road (Ireland)
 Roads in Ireland

External links
 Map of the route

References

Regional roads in the Republic of Ireland
Roads in County Mayo